Emarginula candida is a species of sea snail, a marine gastropod mollusk in the family Fissurellidae, the keyhole limpets and slit limpets.

Description
The size of the shell varies between 10 mm and 15 mm.

Distribution
This marine species occurs off Queensland, Victoria and Tasmania.

References

External links
 To World Register of Marine Species
 

Fissurellidae
Gastropods described in 1852